"The Word Girl" is a song by British pop band Scritti Politti. Included on their second studio album, Cupid & Psyche 85, the reggae style track was released as a single in the UK on 29 April 1985 and remains the band's highest charting hit in the UK, peaking at No. 6 on the UK Singles Chart. The music video was directed by John Scarlett-Davis and produced by Nick Verden at Aldabra Films for Virgin Records.

The B-side to the single, "Flesh and Blood", is an alternative version of the song with Ranking Ann on vocals.

Chart performance

References

External links

1985 singles
Scritti Politti songs
1985 songs
Virgin Records singles
Songs written by Green Gartside
Songs written by David Gamson